Interpretation and Social Criticism is a 1987 book about political philosophy by Michael Walzer.

Reception
Interpretation and Social Criticism has, together with Just and Unjust Wars (1977) and Spheres of Justice (1983), been identified as one of Walzer's most important works by the philosopher Will Kymlicka.

References

Sources

Books

 

1987 non-fiction books
American non-fiction books
Books by Michael Walzer
Books in political philosophy
English-language books
Harvard University Press books